The 52nd Annual GMA Dove Awards presentation ceremony was held on Tuesday, October 19, 2021 at the Allen Arena located in Nashville, Tennessee. The ceremony recognized the accomplishments of musicians and other figures within the Christian music industry for the year 2021. The awards show was aired on the Trinity Broadcasting Network on Friday, October 22, 2021. 

The nominees were announced on August 11, 2021, with producer and songwriter Steven Furtick leading ten nominations among non-artists, whilst Elevation Worship and Brandon Lake led the artist nominations with seven each. CeCe Winans won the most awards, with 4 including Gospel Artist of the Year, alongside producer Jason Ingram and worship band Elevation Worship, who both also clinched 4 awards each, the latter winning Song of the Year for "The Blessing". Pop duo For King & Country won their second consecutive Artist of the Year, whilst Maverick City Music took home the New Artist of the Year award.

Nominations announcement 
The nominations were announced on August 11, 2021, during a livestream event which was broadcast on the GMA Dove Awards' Facebook page and YouTube channel. The event featured Alex Campos, John Cooper, Bill and Gloria Gaither, Kari Jobe, Brian and Jenn Johnson, Jonathan McReynolds, Wande and Tauren Wells as the announcers.

Performers 
The following musical artists performed at the 52nd GMA Dove Awards:
 Brandon Lake
 Cain
 CeCe Winans
 Dante Bowe
 Donnie McClurkin
 Elevation Worship
 Hope Darst
 Jonathan McReynolds
 Kelontae Gavin
 KB
 Koryn Hawthorne
 Lauren Daigle
 Mali Music
 Matt Redman
 Maverick City Music
 Natalie Grant
 The Isaacs
 We the Kingdom
 Zach Williams

Presenters 
The following served as presenters at the 52nd GMA Dove Awards:
 Anthony Brown
 Blanca
 Brooke Ligertwood
 Christine D'Clario
 Chris Tomlin
 Cory Asbury
 Evan Craft
 Francesca Battistelli
 Hezekiah Walker
 Jason Crabb
 Jay DeMarcus
 Jekalyn Carr
 Joel Houston
 Joseph Habedank
 Kelontae Gavin
 Kevin Quinn
 Lecrae
 Mali Music
 Pastor Mike Jr.
 Sinach
 Social Club Misfits

Nominees and winners 
This is a complete list of the nominees & winners for the 52nd GMA Dove Awards. Winners are in bold.

General 

Song of the Year
"Another in the Fire" 
(writers) Chris Davenport, Joel Houston, (publishers) Hillsong MP Songs, Hillsong Music Publishing Australia
"Famous For (I Believe)" 
(writers) Alexis Slifer, Chuck Butler, Jordan Sapp, Krissy Nordhoff, Tauren Wells, (publishers) All Essential Music, Be Essential Songs, Buddybabe Music, Capitol CMG Paragon, Crucial Music Entertainment, Integrity's Praise! Music, Jord A Lil Music, Nordained Music, Songs By JSapp
"Graves into Gardens"
(writers) Steven Furtick, Chris Brown, Tiffany Hudson, Brandon Lake, (publishers) Bethel Music Publishing, Brandon Lake Music, Maverick City Publishing Worldwide, Music by Elevation Worship Publishing
"Speak to Me" 
(writers) Donnie McClurkin, Jeremy Hicks, Johnta Austin, Troy Taylor, (publishers) Don Mac Music, Naked Under My Clothes Music, Peermusic III Ltd, Savgos Music Inc, Sony/Atv Tunes Llc, W S Music
"Thank You for It All" 
(writers) Aaron Lindsey, Christopher Thomas Leach, Jamone Davis, Marvin Sapp, (publishers) Capitol Cmg Paragon, Five Lions Publishing, Jarmone Hoox Davis Publishing, Marvin L. Sapp Music, Universal Music Brentwood Benson Songs
"The Blessing" 
(writers) Chris Brown, Cody Carnes, Kari Jobe, Steven Furtick, (publishers) Capitol CMG Paragon, Kari Jobe Carnes Music, Music by Elevation Worship Publishing, Worship Together Music, Writer's Roof Publishing
"The Father's House" 
(writers) Benjamin Hastings, Cory Asbury, Ethan Hulse, (publishers) Be Essential Songs, Bethel Music Publishing, Cory Asbury Publishing, EGH Music Publishing, SHOUT! Music Publishing Australia
"There Was Jesus" 
(writers) Jonathan Smith, Casey Beathard, Zach Williams, (publishers) Anthems of Hope, Be Essential Songs, Cashagamble Jet Music, Little Louder Songs, Seven Ring Circus Songs, Wisteria Drive
"Together" 
(writers) Joel Smallbone, Josh Kerr, Kirk Franklin, Luke Smallbone, Ran Jackson, Ricky Jackson (publishers) Curb Dayspring Music, Curb Word Music, Heavenly Junkie Music, Kilns Music, Method to the Madness, Richmond Park Publishing, Shankel Songs, Shaun Shankel Pub Designee, Warner-Tamerlane Publishing Corp., WC Music Corp.
"Truth Be Told" 
(writers) AJ Pruis, Matthew West, (publishers) Combustion Five, Get Ur Seek On, Highly Combustible Music, Two Story House Music

Songwriter of the Year
Brandon Lake
Chris Brown
Ed Cash
Kirk Franklin
Matthew West

Songwriter of the Year (Non-artist)
Ethan Hulse
Jason Ingram
Jordan Sapp
Steven Furtick
Tiffany Hammer

Contemporary Christian Artist of the Year
For King & Country, Curb  Word Entertainment
Hillsong United, Hillsong Music
Tauren Wells, Provident Label Group
We the Kingdom, Sparrow Records
Zach Williams, Essential Records / Provident

Southern Gospel Artist of the Year
Ernie Haase & Signature Sound, Gaither Music
Gaither Vocal Band, Gaither Music
Jason Crabb, Red Street Records
Joseph Habedank, Daywind Records
Triumphant Quartet, StowTown

Gospel Artist of the Year
CeCe Winans, Pure Springs Gospel / Fair Trade
Jonathan McReynolds, E1 Music
Kirk Franklin, RCA Inspiration
Tasha Cobbs Leonard, Motown Gospel
Travis Greene, RCA Inspiration

Artist of the Year
Elevation Worship, Elevation Worship Records
For King & Country, Curb  Word Entertainment
Lauren Daigle, Centricity Music
Phil Wickham, Fair Trade
Zach Williams, Essential Records / Provident

New Artist of the Year
Brandon Lake, Bethel Music
Cain, Provident Label Group
Dante Bowe, Bethel Music
Hope Darst, Fair Trade
Maverick City Music, Tribl Records

Producer of the Year
AyRon Lewis
The Creak Music (David Leonard, Brad King, Seth Talley)
Jordan Mohilowski
Jordan Sapp
Wayne Haun

Rap/Hip Hop 

Rap/Hip Hop Recorded Song of the Year
"10K" – KB
(writers) Kevin Elijah Burgess, Wes the Writer, Quinten Coblentz, Jonas Myrin, Matt Redman
"Deep End" – Lecrae
(writers) Lecrae Moore, Anthony MrWriteNow Gardner
"Glory on Me" – Steven Malcolm, featuring Childish Major and Taylor Hill
(writers) Joseph Prielozny, Markus Randle, Steven Malcolm, Taylor Hill, Torrance Esmond
"Is That Okay?" – Social Club Misfits
(writers) Martin Santiago, Fernando Miranda, Jimmy James
"Reasons" – Hulvey, featuring Lecrae, SVRCINA
(writers) Christopher Michael Hulvey, Zach Paradis, Lecrae Moore, Molly Svrcina, Sam Tinnesz, Joe Williams

Rap/Hip Hop Album of the Year
1970-01-01 03:34:00 – Zauntee
(producers) Zauntee, Jordan Mohilowski, Geoff Duncan, Mako, Riley Friesen, Jordan Sapp
Feared By Hell – Social Club Misfits
(producers) Jimmy James, Martin Santiago, Samuel Ash, Tommee Profitt, Dirty Rice, Ben Lopez, Juicebangers
His Glory Alone – KB(producers) Quinten Coblentz, Wes Writer, Jacob Cardec, Mashell Leroy, DJ Pez, Tee-Wyla Swoope, Kevin Elijah BurgessRestoration – Lecrae
(producers) Dave James, Lasanna "Ace" Harris, Taylor Hill, Alex Medina, Raymond Castro "Ray Rock", Gawvi, S1 for S.K.P.
The Divine Storm – Ty Brasel
(producers) Dirty Rice, Joseph Prielozny, Juicebangers, Ty Brasel

 Rock/Contemporary Rock/Contemporary Recorded Song of the Year"I Need a Ghost" – Brandon Lake
(writers) Brandon Lake, Joshua Silverberg
"A Place Called Earth" – Jon Foreman, featuring Lauren Daigle
(writers) Jonathan Foreman, Tim Foreman, Lauren Daigle
"Stand My Ground" – Zach Williams
(writers) Zach Williams, Jonathan Smith, Hank Bentley
"This Is the Kingdom" - Skillet
(writers) John L. Cooper, Mia Fieldes, Seth Mosley"Who Am I" - Needtobreathe(writers) Bear Rinehart, Thomas Rhett, Jordan Reynolds, Cason Cooley, Jeremy LutitoRock/Contemporary Album of the YearDepartures – Jon Foreman
(producers) Jon Foreman, Erick Owyoung, Tim Foreman, Jeremy Larson, Darren KingOut of Body – Needtobreathe(producers) Needtobreathe, Cason Cooley, Jeremy LutitoSongs of Death and Resurrection – Demon Hunter
(producer) Jeremiah Scott
The Joy of Being – Citizens
(producers) Brian Eichelberger, Zach Bolen
The Path – Fit for a King
(producer) WZRD BLD

 Pop/Contemporary Pop/Contemporary Recorded Song of the Year"Famous For (I Believe)" – Tauren Wells(writers) Alexis Slifer, Chuck Butler, Jordan Sapp, Krissy Nordhoff, Tauren Wells"Good God Almighty" – Crowder
(writers) David Crowder, Ben Glover, Jeff Sojka
"Hold on to Me" – Lauren Daigle
(writers) Lauren Daigle, Paul Duncan, Paul Mabury
"There Was Jesus" - Zach Williams, featuring Dolly Parton
(writers) Jonathan Smith, Casey Beathard, Zach Williams
"Together" - For King & Country, Tori Kelly and Kirk Franklin
(writers) Joel Smallbone, Josh Kerr, Kirk Franklin, Luke Smallbone, Ran Jackson, Ricky JacksonPop/Contemporary Album of the YearChris Tomlin & Friends – Chris Tomlin
(producer) Chris Tomlin, Corey Crowder, Tyler Hubbard, Brian Kelley, Ed Cash, Dave Haywood, David GarciaHoly Water – We the Kingdom(producers) We the Kingdom, Ed Cash, Steven V. TaylorInhale (Exhale) – MercyMe
(producers) Brown Bannister, Jordan Mohilowski, Tedd Tjornhom, Chris Stevens, Micah Kuiper, David Leonard, Ben Glover
No Stranger – Natalie Grant
(producers) Bernie Herms for SoulFuel Productions, Joseph Prielozny, Dirty Rice for COBRA
To Love a Fool – Cory Asbury
(producers) Paul Mabury

 Inspirational Inspirational Recorded Song of the Year"A Woman" – Faithful, Ellie Holcomb and Amy Grant
(writers) Ellie Holcomb, Ann VosKamp, Sarah MacIntosh
"Alone with My Faith" – Harry Connick, Jr.
(writer) Harry Connick, Jr."Great Is Thy Faithfulness" – Carrie Underwood, featuring CeCe Winans(writers) Thomas Obadiah Chisholm, William M. Runyan"Promise Keeper" – Hope Darst
(writers) Hope Darst, Jonathan Smith, Ethan Hulse
"There Is a God" – Phillips, Craig & Dean
(writers) Randy Phillips, Matthew West, AJ PruisInspirational Album of the YearAll Things – Jaime Jamgochian
(producers) Jaime Jamgochian, Jeremy Redmon, Andrew Berthgold, Antonio Porcheddu, Benton Miles, Micah Kuiper, Tommy Iceland, Austin Cannon
Evensong - Hymns and Lullabies at the Close of Day – Keith & Kristyn Getty, Sandra McCracken, Skye Peterson, Vince Gill, Ellie Holcomb, Sierra Hull, Deborah Klemme, The Getty Girls, Heather Headley
(producers) Ben Shive, Keith & Kristyn GettyStep into My Story – Selah(producers) Jason Kyle SaetveitYou Are More – Tiffany Coburn
(producers) Wayne Haun, Mike Swift
You're Still God – Phillips, Craig & Dean
(producer) Nathan Nockels

 Southern Gospel Southern Gospel Recorded Song of the Year"First Church of Mercy" – The Sound
(writers) Aaron Wilburn, Lee Black
"I Just Feel Like Something Good Is About to Happen" – Gaither Vocal Band
(writer) William J. Gaither"My King is Known By Love" – Crabb Family(writers) Jason Cox, Jeff Bumgardner, Kenna West"Religion Isn't Working" – Joseph Habedank
(writers) Jesse Reeves, Joseph Habedank, Michael Farren, Nick Romes, Tony Wood
"Wake Up" – Ernie Haase & Signature Sound
(writers) Ernie Haase, Wayne Haun, Joel LindseySouthern Gospel Album of the YearBigger Than Sunday – Triumphant Quartet
(producers) Wayne Haun, Scott Inman, Jason Webb, Kris Crunk, Chipper Hammond, Joshua FrerichsChange Is Coming – Joseph Habedank(producer) Dottie Leonard Miller, Wayne Haun, Joseph Habedank, Lindsey HabedankIt's Still Good News – Guardians
(producers) Wayne Haun, John Darin Rowesy
That's Gospel, Brother – Gaither Vocal Band
(producer) Gordon Mote, Bill Gaither
The Journey – Greater Vision
(producers) Trey Ivey, Gerald Wolfe

 Bluegrass/Country/Roots Bluegrass/Country/Roots Recorded Song of the Year"Because He Lives" - Harry Connick, Jr.
(writers) Bill Gaither, Gloria Gaither
"Better Off There" – The Browns
(writers) Wayne Haun, Sonya Issacs Yeary, Jimmy Yeary
"Go Rest High on That Mountain" – Fortune/Walker/Rogers/Isaacs
(writers) Vince Gill
"Great God Almighty" – The Sound
(writers) David Carr, Johnny Powell, Mark Lee"If God Pulled Back the Curtain" – The Nelons(writers) Jason Cox, Kenna Turner West, Michael BoggsBluegrass/Country/Roots Album of the YearAlone with My Faith – Harry Connick, Jr.
(producer) Harry Connick Jr.
Little More Love – Jordan Family Band
(producers) Joshua Jordan, Gordon Mote
My Savior – Carrie Underwood
(producers) Carrie Underwood, David Garcia
Peace at Last - The Nelons
(producers) Dottie Leonard Miller, Wayne Haun, Jason ClarkSongs for the Times - The Isaacs(producers) Ben Isaacs, The Isaacs Contemporary Gospel Contemporary Gospel Recorded Song of the Year"I Got It" – Pastor Mike Jr.
(writer) Amanda Gentry, Anthony R. Pettus Jr., Pastor Mike Jr."Joyful" – Dante Bowe(writers) Dante Bowe, Ben Schofield"Never Lost" - CeCe Winans
(writers) Chris Brown, Steven Furtick, Tiffany Hammer
"Speak to Me" – Koryn Hawthorne
(writer) Donnie McClurkin, Jeremy Hicks, Johnta Austin, Troy Taylor
"Touch from You" – Tamela Mann
(writers) Rickey "Slikk Muzik" Offord, Andrew Collins, II, Jeremy "J-Mu" Hairston, Emerald Campbell, Quennel Gaskin, Tamela MannContemporary Gospel Album of the YearDOE - EP – DOE
(producers) Jonathan McReynolds, Darryl "Lil Man" Howell, Rogest "Roscoe" Carstarphen
Gospel According to PJ – PJ Morton
(producer) PJ MortonI Am – Koryn Hawthorne(producers) Troy Taylor, Johntá Austin, Jeremy "TryBishop" Hicks, Camper, KJ Scriven, Greg Cox, Anthony "Kid Class" Wyley, Connor Little, Jason Ingram, Matt Maher, Jacob SooterStill – Brian Courtney Wilson
(producer) Dana T. Soréy, Jeff Pardo, Justin Savage, Tyrone Belle, Brian Courtney Wilson 
The Book of Mali – Mali Music
(producers) David D1 Grant, Derrick Harvin

 Traditional Gospel Traditional Gospel Recorded Song of the Year"Changing Your Story" – Jekalyn Carr(writer) Jekalyn Carr"Help" – Anthony Brown & Group therAPy
(writers) Anthony Brown, Darryl Woodson
"I Made It" – Maranda Curtis
(writers) Maranda Curtis, Dana Sorey, Justin Gilbert
"Repay You" – PJ Morton, featuring J Moss
(writer) Paul Sylvester Morton Jr.
"Wonderful Is Your Name" – Melvin Crispel III
(writer) Melvin Crispell IIITraditional Gospel Album of the YearCelebrating Fisk! (The 150th Anniversary Album) – Fisk Jubilee Singers
(producers) Shannon Sanders, Jim Ed Norman, Mike Curb
Changing Your Story – Jekalyn Carr
(producer) Allen Carr
Choirmaster – Ricky Dillard
(producers) Ricky Dillard, Michael Taylor, Will Bogle, Quadrius SaltersChosen Vessel – Marvin Sapp(producer) Aaron LindseyThe Reunion – Jonathan Nelson
(producers) Jonathan Nelson, Kenneth Shelton

 Gospel Worship Gospel Worship Recorded Song of the Year"Believe for It" – CeCe Winans(writers) CeCe Winans, Kyle Lee, Mitch Wong, Dwan Hill"Good & Loved" – Travis Greene, featuring Steffany Gretzinger
(writer) Travis Greene
"Never Be Defeated" – Rich Tolbert Jr.
(writer) Rich Tolbert Jr.
"Voice of God" – Dante Bowe, featuring Steffany Gretzinger, Chandler Moore
(writers) Dante Bowe, Jeff Schneeweis, Mitch Wong, Tywan Mack
"You Get The Glory" – Jonathan Traylor
(writer) Jonathan TraylorGospel Worship Album of the YearBelieve for It – CeCe Winans(producers) Kyle Lee, Dwan HillCome Alive (Deluxe) – All Nations Music
(producer) Ernest Vaughan
Never Be Defeated – Rich Tolbert Jr.
(producers) Rich Tolbert Jr., Joshua Easley, Will Davis, Shajuan Andrews
The N.O.W. Experience – Kelontae Gavin
(producers) Kelontae Gavin, Marquis Boone
VaShawn Mitchell Presents Africa Worship – Various Artists
(producer) VaShawn Mitchell

 Spanish Language Spanish Language Recorded Song of the Year"Amén" – Ricardo Montaner, Evaluna Montaner, Mau y Ricky, y Camilo
(writers) Ricardo Montaner, Camilo Echeverry, Ricky Montaner, Mau Montaner, Evaluna Montaner, Richi López"Donde Está El Espíritu De Dios" – Christine D'Clario(writers) Christine D'Clario, Chris Tomlin, Jason Ingram, Ben Fielding, Seth Mosley"Llévame A La Cruz" – Majo y Dan
(writers) Eduardo Danilo Ruiz Guzmán, María José Solís González, David Hernández Pimentel
"Mi Libertador" – Miel San Marcos, Christine D'Clario
(writers) Josh Morales, Sayra Morales, Luis Morales Jr, Christine D'Clario
"Tumbas A Jardines" – Elevation Worship, featuring Brandon Lake
(writers) Steven Furtick, Chris Brown, Tiffany Hudson, Brandon LakeSpanish Language Album of the YearDesesperado (Spanish) – Evan Craft(producer) Sean CookMil Generaciones – Miel San Marcos, Essential Worship
(producers) Sam Ash, Alexandria Davila, Henry Alonzo, Diana Alfonso
Renovada - EP – Blanca
(producers) Gawvi, Samuel ASH
Todos Mis Mejores Amigos – Hillsong Young & Free, Hillsong En Español
(producers) Ben Tan, Cameron Robertson, Michael Guy Chislett, Michael Fatkin, Aodhan King, Laura Toggs
Uno – Alex Zurdo - Redimi2 - Funky
(producer) Luis "Funky" Marrero

 Worship Worship Recorded Song of the Year"Battle Belongs" – Phil Wickham
(writers) Phil Wickham, Brian Johnson
"God So Loved" – We the Kingdom
(writers) Ed Cash, Scott Cash, Franni Cash, Martin Cash, Andrew Bergthold"Graves into Gardens" – Elevation Worship, featuring Brandon Lake(writers) Steven Furtick, Chris Brown, Tiffany Hudson, Brandon Lake"Jireh" – Elevation Worship / Maverick City Music, featuring Chandler Moore and Naomi Raine
(writers) Steven Furtick, Chris Brown, Chandler Moore, Naomi Raine
"Peace Be Still" – Hope Darst
(writers) Hope Darst, Mia Fieldes, Andrew HoltWorship Album of the YearGraves into Gardens – Elevation Worship
(producers) Steven Furtick, Aaron Robertson, Chris Brown, Jonathan MixOld Church Basement – Elevation Worship / Maverick City Music(producers) Steven Furtick, Chris Brown, Jason Ingram, Tony Brown, Jonathan JayRevival's in the Air – Bethel Music
(producer) Brian Johnson, Joel Taylor, David Whitworth, John-Paul Gentile, Mathew Ogden
The Blessing (Live) – Kari Jobe
(producers) Henry Seeley, Cody Carnes, Austin Davis, Jacob Sooter, McKendree Tucker
The People Tour: Live from Madison Square Garden – Hillsong United
(producers) Joel Houston, Michael Guy Chislett

 Other categories Children's Album of the YearLiving Color – Elevation Church Kids
(producers) Steven Furtick, Aaron Robertson
No Reason To Wait – Worship Together Kids
(producers) Terryl Padilla, John RobertsReady Set Go – Yancy & Little Praise Party(producer) Stephen LeiwekeSing The Bible, Vol. 4 – Slugs And Bugs
(producer) Ben Shive
Todos Mis Días – Gateway Kids Worship
(producers) Julian Collazos, Kyle Lee, Josh AlltopChristmas / Special Event Album of the YearA Drummer Boy Christmas – For King & Country(producers) Benjamin Backus, Tedd T., For King & CountryA Tori Kelly Christmas – Tori Kelly
(producers) Kenny "Babyface" Edmonds, Demonte Posey, Tori Kelly, Wendy Wang
Christmas: Acoustic Sessions – Phil Wickham
(producer) David Cook
Miracle Of Love: Christmas Songs Of Worship – Chris Tomlin
(producers) Ed Cash, Corey Crowder
Reunited LIVE – Gaither Vocal Band
(producer) Bill GaitherMusical/Choral CollectionBehold The Lamb Of God
(creators) Andrew Peterson, (arrangers/orchestrators) Carson Wagner, Russell Mauldin
Christmas Comes Alive
(creators/arrangers/orchestrators) Devin McGlamery, Cliff Duren, Phillip Keveren, Phil Nitz
I Choose Christ: The Songs of Sue C. Smith
(creator/arranger) Cliff Duren, (creator) Sue C. Smith
Love Lifted Up: An Easter Musical
(creators/arrangers/orchestrators) Jason Cox, Joseph Habedank, Cliff Duren, Jay Rouse, Marty Hamby, Phil Nitz
Love Was Born A King
(creators/arrangers/orchestrators) Joel Lindsey, Jeff Bumgardner

Recorded Music Packaging of the Year
A Drummer Boy Christmas – For King & Country
(art director)Blair McDermott, (photographer) Robby Klein, (illustrator) Andrew Cherry
Graves into Gardens – Elevation Worship(art directors) Jacob Boyles, Ryan Hollingsworth, (graphic artist) Jacob Boyles, (photographer) Paul C. RiveraRevival's in the Air – Bethel Music
(art director/photographer) Stephen James Hart, (photographers) Chad Vegas, Jordana Griffith, Caleb Marmolejo
Songs of Death and Resurrection - Deluxe Box – Demon Hunter
(art director/graphic artist/illustrator/photographer) Ryan Clark
The Blessing (Live) – Kari Jobe
(art director/graphic artist/photographer) Connor Dwyer, (art director/photographer) Rachel Dwyer

 Videos and films Short Form Video of the Year"Help Is on the Way (Maybe Midnight)" – TobyMac(director) Eric Welch, (producer) Scott McDaniel"Hold on to Me" – Lauren Daigle
(directors/producers) John Gray, Leigh Holt
"Is That Okay?" – Social Club Misfits
(director/producer) Anler Hernandez
"Truth Be Told" – Matthew West
(directors/producers) Kyle Lollis, Ashley Lollis
"Walking Backwards" – Mike Mains & The Branches
(directors) Robbie Barnett, Carson ButcherLong Form Video of the YearBurn The Ships Concert Film – For King & Country(directors/producers) Ben Smallbone, Andrea RoyerHouse of Miracles (Live) – Brandon Lake
(director/producer) Caleb Marmolejo
Natalie Grant & Bernie Herms at Ryman Auditorium – Natalie Grant
(directors/producers) Kristi Brazell, Shelby Goldsmith
Still: The Artistry & Life of Fanny J. Crosby Reimagined – Ashley Elizabeth Sarver & O.N.U. Theatre Original Cast
(directors/producers) Ashley Elizabeth Sarver, Joe Mantarian
The People Tour: Live from Madison Square Garden – Hillsong United
(director) Nathaniel Redekop, (producers) Johnny Rays, Jessica IcoInspirational Film of the YearA Week Away
(director) Roman White, (producer) Alan Powell
Fatima
(director) Marco Pontecorvo, (producers) Stefano Buono, Rose Ganguzza
Mahalia
(director) Kenny Leon, (producers) Moshe Bardach, Charles Cooper
My Brother's Keeper
(director) Kevan Otto, (producers) Robert C. Bigelow, Daniel Buggs
Queen Esther
(director) Ryan Miller, (producer) Dean Sell

References

External links 
 

2021 music awards
GMA Dove Awards
2021 in American music
2021 in Tennessee
GMA